Frank Fred Schneiberg (March 12, 1880 – May 19, 1948) was a pitcher in Major League Baseball. He pitched in one game for the 1910 Brooklyn Superbas. He worked one inning in a game on June 8, 1910, and gave up five hits, four walks and seven earned runs.

Schneiberg was the youngest of nine children born to Johann Schneiberg and Katerina Karabova, immigrants from German-speaking Bohemia.

References

External links

1880 births
1948 deaths
American people of German descent
Baseball players from Milwaukee
Major League Baseball pitchers
Brooklyn Superbas players
Springfield Hustlers players
La Crosse Pinks players
Milwaukee Brewers (minor league) players
Des Moines Boosters players
Memphis Chickasaws players
Freeport Pretzels players